William Dill may refer to:
 William L. Dill, American jurist and politician in New Jersey
 William Rankin Dill, American academic administrator, president of Babson College